Josef Jelínek (born 9 January 1941) is a Czech football player. He played for Czechoslovakia, for which he played 10 matches and scored 2 goals.

He was a participant in the 1962 FIFA World Cup, where Czechoslovakia won the silver medal.

In his country he spent his best years playing for Dukla Prague. He won the Czechoslovak First League five times with Dukla; and the Czechoslovak Cup for the three times.

Jelínek spent five season in the NASL from 1972 to 1976, playing for the New York Cosmos, the Rochester Lancers and the Boston Minutemen respectively. He scored the game-winning goal for New York on a penalty kick in the 86th minute of the Cosmos 2–1 victory over St. Louis in the 1972 Championship final. He also played for Torreón during the 1973–74 Mexican Primera División season.

References

1941 births
Czech footballers
Czechoslovak footballers
1962 FIFA World Cup players
Living people
Footballers from Prague
Czechoslovakia international footballers
Bohemians 1905 players
Dukla Prague footballers
Go Ahead Eagles players
Eredivisie players
New York Cosmos players
Rochester Lancers (1967–1980) players
Boston Minutemen players
Czechoslovak expatriate footballers
Expatriate footballers in the Netherlands
Czechoslovak expatriate sportspeople in the Netherlands
North American Soccer League (1968–1984) players
Expatriate soccer players in the United States
Czechoslovak expatriate sportspeople in the United States
Expatriate footballers in Mexico
Czechoslovak expatriate sportspeople in Mexico
Liga MX players
Association football forwards